Sphenomorphus tonkinensis, the Tonkin forest skink, is a species of skink found in Vietnam.

References

tonkinensis
Reptiles described in 2011
Reptiles of Vietnam